Nidar is a Norwegian producer and distributor of confectionery. Nidar's candy factory is located in Trondheim, Norway. It is part of the Orkla Group.
	
The company is one of the leading distributor of sweets to the Norwegian marketplace, selling sweets for over NOK 1 billion in 2003, with approx. 600 employees. In January, 2005, the company had a market share of 31.4%.

Nidar produces chocolate, sugar products, confectionery candy, marzipan and pastilles, in addition to having responsibility of distribution and sales of Wrigley chewing gum and sweets in the Norwegian marketplace. Among their most known and popular brands include: Stratos, Laban, Troika, Crispo, NERO, Smash!, Doc' Halslinser (with or without liquid core), New Energy, Bocca, Bamsemums, Smørbukk, Mokka Trøffel, Mokka Bønner, Nidar Julemarsipan, Extra, Krembanan and Kremtopper.

Nidar was established in 1912 and still based out of Trondheim, Norway. The company went through several acquisitions and mergers in the 1970s, and as such carries on the products and traditions of three other Norwegian candy companies:
 Kiellands Fabrikker A/S, Oslo, est. 1891
 Lorentz Erbe & Søn A/S, Trondheim, est. 1899
 Bergene A/S, Oslo, est. 1906

Products
Krembanan is a chocolate-banana candy bar in the shape of a banana. The Krembanan was first made in 1957, and its appearance today has not changed. It is made of one layer of gel and one layer of banana cream covered by chocolate. All Krembanan bars have the same appearance and all weigh 35g. The manufacturer still uses the original machine to pack these "chocolate with a bend" bars; the machine has been in use since 1957 and is the oldest machine in use by Nidar.

References

External links
Nidar Official Site
Orkla Group Official Site
 Smash! Official Site
 Julemarsipan Official Site
Doc' Official Site

Food and drink companies of Norway
Manufacturing companies of Norway
Companies based in Trondheim
Food and drink companies established in 1912
Orkla ASA
1912 establishments in Norway